Dimitar Taskov (born 9 June 1967) is a Bulgarian gymnast. He competed at the 1988 Summer Olympics where he placed 20th in the individual all around and 5th with the Bulgarian team in the team final.

References

External links
 

1967 births
Living people
Bulgarian male artistic gymnasts
Olympic gymnasts of Bulgaria
Gymnasts at the 1988 Summer Olympics
People from Bansko
Sportspeople from Blagoevgrad Province